When Strangers Appear is a 2001 psychological thriller film directed by Scott Reynolds and starring Radha Mitchell, Barry Watson, and Josh Lucas.

Plot 
When Beth (Mitchell) opens her remote roadside diner, she expects another slow day. But almost immediately, Jack (Watson), a handsome drifter bursts in, bleeding and on the run. Within moments, the three surfers Jack claims are chasing him appear and the stage is set for a deadly game of cat and mouse as Beth must decide who to trust.

External links 

2001 films
2001 independent films
2000s mystery thriller films
2001 psychological thriller films
American independent films
American mystery thriller films
American psychological thriller films
Australian independent films
Australian mystery thriller films
New Zealand independent films
New Zealand thriller films
2001 thriller drama films
Films scored by Roger Mason (musician)
2001 drama films
2000s English-language films
2000s American films